Lepidophyma is a genus of lizards, commonly called tropical night lizards. The genus Lepidophyma (Greek for "warty scales") is one of three genera of night lizards (family Xantusiidae), which are a group of viviparous (live-bearing) lizards.  There are 20 species of tropical night lizards in the genus Lepidophyma, making it the most populous night lizard genus.  Species of the genus Lepidophyma are distributed throughout Central America, found anywhere from central Mexico to Panama, depending on the particular species.  Tropical night lizards, particularly the yellow-spotted species, are sometimes called Central American bark lizards by pet dealers and owners.

Species
The following 22 species are recognized as being valid.
Lepidophyma chicoasensis  – Sumidero tropical night lizard
Lepidophyma cuicateca  – Sunidero tropical night lizard
Lepidophyma dontomasi  – MacDougall's tropical night lizard
Lepidophyma flavimaculatum  – Yellow-spotted tropical night lizard
Lepidophyma gaigeae  – Gaige's tropical night lizard
Lepidophyma inagoi 
Lepidophyma lineri  – Liner's tropical night lizard
Lepidophyma lipetzi – Lipetz's tropical night lizard
Lepidophyma lowei  – Lowe's tropical night lizard
Lepidophyma lusca 
Lepidophyma mayae  – Mayan tropical night lizard
Lepidophyma micropholis  – cave tropical night lizard
Lepidophyma occulor  – Jalpan tropical night lizard
Lepidophyma pajapanensis  – Pajapan tropical night lizard
Lepidophyma radula  – Yautepec tropical night lizard
Lepidophyma ramirezi 
Lepidophyma reticulatum  – Costa Rican tropical night lizard
Lepidophyma smithii  – (Andrew) Smith's tropical night lizard
Lepidophyma sylvaticum  – Madrean tropical night lizard
Lepidophyma tarascae  – Tarascan tropical night lizard
Lepidophyma tuxtlae  – Tuxtla tropical night lizard
Lepidophyma zongolica 

Nota bene: A binomial authority in parentheses indicates that the species was originally described in a genus other than Lepidophyma.

References

Further reading
Boulenger GA (1885). Catalogue of the Lizards in the British Museum (Natural History). Second Edition. Volume II. ... Xantusiidæ ... London: Trustees of the British Museum (Natural History). (Taylor and Francis, printers). xiii + 497 pp. + Plates I-XXIV. (Genus Lepidophyma, p. 326).
Duméril AHA (1851). In: Duméril AMC, Duméril AHA (1851). Catalogue méthodique de la Collection des Reptiles du Muséum d'Histoire naturelle de Paris. Paris: Gide et Baudry/Roret. 224 pp. (Lepidophyma, new genus, p. 137). (in French).
Goin CJ, Goin OB, Zug GR (1978). Introduction to Herpetology, Third Edition. San Francisco: W.B. Freeman and Company. xi + 378 pp. . (Genus Lepidophyma, p. 287).

External links
.
.

Lepidophyma
Reptiles of Mexico
Lizards of Central America
Lizard genera
Taxa named by Auguste Duméril